Kureh (also Romanized as Kūreh; also known as Kora and Koreh) is a village in Rudbar Rural District, in the Central District of Tafresh County, Markazi Province, Iran. At the 2006 census, its population was 85, in 23 families.

References 

Populated places in Tafresh County